Team Shaklee was an American pro cycling team from 1987 to 2000. The team director was Frank Scioscia, and riders included Eric Wohlberg, Chris Coletta, John Stenner, John Frey, Mark Waite, and Kent Bostick. In 1988, the team won the team time trial title at the U.S. National Cycling Championships.

Final roster
As at 31 December 2000

Major wins
2000
 Stage 4 Tour of Japan, Graeme Miller

References

Defunct cycling teams based in the United States
UCI Continental Teams (America)
Cycling teams established in 1987
Cycling teams disestablished in 2000
1987 establishments in the United States
2000 disestablishments in the United States